Nan'an District, is one of the six central districts of Chongqing municipality, China. It covers an area of 262.43 km2, with 44 km2 covered with forests and woods. It has an estimated population of 891,000 in late 2017.

Geography
The Yangtze River curves around the north and west border of Nan'an district for about 45 kilometers. The river separates Nan'an from its neighbouring districts such as Jiulongpo, Yuzhong, Jiangbei, and Yubei. The bridges crossing the Yangtze River are the primary passage for transportations to and from the other side of the river. Ferries are also available as a backup and they used to be the only connection to the central part of downtown Chongqing before the first bridge was built in the early 1980s. Nan'an shares the border on the south and east land area with Banan.

History

Nan'an district is one important part of the historical city Chongqing.   It was first established in 1929 as an administrative region when the city underwent expansions.  At that time, it covers the current Nanping, Haitangxi, Longmenhao, and Danzishi Subdistricts. With series changes to its covering area and naming from the year 1929 through 1950, Nan'an got its current name in October 1955.

Administrative divisions

Education
Nan'an district is the home of five colleges and over ten national or provincial research institutes including Chongqing University of Posts and Telecommunications, Chongqing Technology and Business University, Chongqing Jiaotong University, Chongqing Education College, Chongqing Pharmaceutical Research Institute, etc.

Tourist attractions
Nan'an is best known for its abundance of natural and historical tourist attractions. In particular, the Nanshan (Southern Mountains), a mountain ridge running along the southeast border of the district, provides scenic trails and sweeping view of the city. The Ciyun Temple, Tushan Temple, and Laojun Cave were built in as early as the Tang Dynasty. Nanwenquan (Southern Hot Spring) is a hot spring for relaxation. There are also rowing boats. Yikeshu sightseeing spot provides a panorama of Chongqing. Foreigners' Street is an amusement park that includes the world's largest toilet, the Porcelain Palace.

Transportation

Bridges 
The majority of western and northern borders of Nan'an district is wrapped by the Yangtze River, therefore necessitating several connections between the busy districts of central Chongqing. Nan'an is connected to Jiulongpo district by the Egongyan Bridge, and is connected to Yuzhong district by the Caiyuanba Bridge, the historic Shibanpo Yangtze River Bridge (and the later double-line bridge), and the Dongshuimen Bridge. The world's longest through arch bridge, the Chaotianmen Bridge, connects Nan'an to Jiangbei district. Two expressway bridges, Dafosi Bridge (G65, also part of the Chongqing Inner Ring Expressway) and Yuzui Yangtze River Bridge (G5001, a.k.a. Chongqing Ring Expressway), connect Nan'an to Jiangbei and Yubei districts. The latest addition to the bridges, Cuntan Yangtze River Bridge, opened on December 31, 2017, connecting Nan'an to Jiangbei district; its completion significantly reduces commute time to Jiangbei International Airport to around 10 minutes. It is also the location of Huangjuewan interchange, which connects Chongqing Jiangbei Airport main connecting road with the city proper.

Public Transportation

=Chongqing Rail Transit
As of August 2020, Nan'an is currently serviced by Line 3, 6, and the Loop Line as part of the expanding Chongqing Rail Transit network:
 (monorail) stations: Tongyuanju, Gongmao, Nanping, Sigongli, Chongqing Technology and Business University, Liugongli, Chongqing Jiaotong University.
Line 6 (heavy rail) stations: Shangxinjie, Liujiaping, Changshengqiao, Qiujiawan, Chayuan.
Loop Line (heavy rail) stations: Danzishi, Tushan, Renji, Shangxinjie, Shanghao (U/C), Haitangxi, Luojiaba, Nanping, Nanhu, Haixialu.

Buses 
Various bus routes are operated by Chongqing Public Transport with relatively comprehensive coverage in Nan'an. Sigongli Traffic Hub, adjacent to Sigongli station of Chongqing Rail Transit, provides long-distance bus services.

Ferries 
Ferries are regularly scheduled from Danzishi to Chaotianmen in Yuzhong District across the Yangtze River.

Cableway 

Spanning 1166 meters across the Yangtze River, the Yangtze River Cableway is a scenic staple of Chongqing. Opened in 1987, the cableway has two stations on either side of the river: the south Longmenhao station is located in Nan'an and north Xinhua Road Station in Yuzhong district.

References

 
Districts of Chongqing